George Knipp & Brother Building is a historic retail building located at Baltimore, Maryland, United States. It is a five-story brick commercial structure with a four-bay cast-iron façade, constructed about 1875. It features large window openings flanked by Corinthian columns.  It was originally the location of John Knipps’ furniture business and his brother George Knipp's enterprise in gas fixtures and plumbing supplies. It was later occupied by a furniture and carpet firm and later a J.G. McCrory Co. store.

George Knipp & Brother Building was listed on the National Register of Historic Places in 1994.

References

External links
, including photo from 1986, at Maryland Historical Trust

Cast-iron architecture in Baltimore
Commercial buildings on the National Register of Historic Places in Baltimore
Commercial buildings completed in 1875
Downtown Baltimore
McCrory Stores